Aine Lesley Davis (born 11 February 1984), also known as Jihadi Paul, is a British convert to Islam who was convicted in a Turkish court of being a member of a terrorist group while serving as a fighter for the ISIL.

Firearms conviction

Prior to leaving the United Kingdom, Davis is reported to have been a drug dealer who had a conviction for possession of firearms.

2014 conviction of Davis's wife

Davis' wife, Amal el-Wahabi, was convicted, in 2014, of funding terrorism, when she tried to use a friend to smuggle 20,000 euros to him.

Messages on el-Wahabi's mobile phone, between herself and Davis were used by the prosecution to argue that el-Wahabi should have realized Davis was involved in militancy.

Citing text messages the pair exchanged on their mobile phones, the prosecution argued that el-Wahabi arranged the funds transfer to retain Davis's loyalty, because he had talked of taking a second wife.

Foreign captives

ISIL held some European and North American captives, and it was widely reported that they were tortured, subjected to mock executions, and some of them were ultimately beheaded.  Four United Kingdom guards, dubbed The Beatles, were alleged to have played a central role in their abuse. The most vocal, who appeared in several videos, issuing threats, was dubbed "Jihadi John".  Davis, whose identity had not been established, was alleged to have been "Jihadi Paul".

Turkish capture and conviction
Davis was captured by Turkish security officials, in Istanbul, on 12 November 2015. A Turkish court subsequently convicted him of being a member of a terrorist group and sentenced him to seven and a half years in jail.

At his trial in 2017, Davis denied being a member of Islamic State. He claimed to have been living in Gaziantep, Turkey and to have visited Syria on only two occasions to do "aid work". He further claimed to have travelled to Istanbul with the purpose of obtaining a fake passport as he was aware he was a "wanted man". He admitted being acquainted with Mohammed Emwazi, aka Jihadi John, having attended the same mosque, in London but denied encountering him in Syria. He claimed a photo of him, posing with armed fighters, dated to 2013, and he had taken it as a joke in Idlib and did not know who the gunmen were.

Call for trial in the United Kingdom

In February 2018, several captives who had endured abuse by the surviving members of "The Beatles", called for them to face prosecution in the United Kingdom.

Deportation to the United Kingdom and further terrorism charges
On 10 August 2022, Davis was deported from Turkey to the United Kingdom. Upon arrival at Luton Airport, he was arrested by the Metropolitan Police Counter Terrorism Command and taken into custody under various sections of the Terrorism Act 2000. On 11 August 2022, he was charged under sections 15, 17 and 57 of the Terrorism Act 2000 and remanded into custody. Davis' trial is scheduled to start on 27 February 2023 where he faces charges of funding terrorism and "possession of a firearm for a purpose connected with terrorism". The trial will take place  at the Old Bailey.

References

1984 births
Living people
English Islamists
Converts to Islam
Islamic State of Iraq and the Levant members
Islamic State of Iraq and the Levant and the United Kingdom